The Advance Sigma is a series of Swiss single-place, paragliders, designed and produced by Advance Thun of Thun.

Design and development
The Sigma was designed as a cross country intermediate glider.

The design has progressed through nine generations of models, the Sigma, Sigma 2, 3, 4, 5, 6, 7, 8 and 9, each improving on the last. The models are each named for their rough wing area in square metres.

Variants
Sigma 5 23
Small-sized model for lighter pilots. The glider model is DHV 2 certified.
Sigma 5 26
Mid-sized model for medium-weight pilots. The glider model is DHV 2 certified.
Sigma 5 28
Large-sized model for heavier pilots. The glider model is DHV 2 certified.
Sigma 5 31
Extra large-sized model for heavier pilots. The glider model is DHV 2 certified.
Sigma 6 22
Small-sized model for lighter pilots. The glide ratio is 9.2:1.
Sigma 6 26
Mid-sized model for medium-weight pilots. The glide ratio is 9.2:1.
Sigma 6 28
Large-sized model for heavier pilots. The glide ratio is 9.2:1.
Sigma 6 31
Extra large-sized model for heavier pilots. The glide ratio is 9.2:1.
Sigma 7 23
Small-sized model for lighter pilots. The glider model is EN/LTF 2 certified. The glide ratio is 9.2:1.
Sigma 7 26
Mid-sized model for medium-weight pilots. The glider model is EN/LTF 2 certified. The glide ratio is 9.2:1.
Sigma 7 28
Large-sized model for heavier pilots. The glider model is EN/LTF 2 certified. The glide ratio is 9.2:1.
Sigma 7 31
Extra large-sized model for heavier pilots. The glider model is EN/LTF 2 certified. The glide ratio is 9.2:1.
Sigma 8 23
Small-sized model for lighter pilots. The glider model is EN/LTF certified. The glide ratio is 10:1.
Sigma 8 25
Mid-sized model for medium-weight pilots. The glider model is EN/LTF certified. The glide ratio is 10:1.
Sigma 8 27
Large-sized model for heavier pilots. The glider model is EN/LTF certified. The glide ratio is 10:1.
Sigma 8 29
Extra large-sized model for heavier pilots. The glider model is EN/LTF certified. The glide ratio is 10:1.
Sigma 9 23
Small-sized model for lighter pilots. The glider model is EN/LTF C certified.
Sigma 9 25
Mid-sized model for medium-weight pilots. The glider model is EN/LTF C certified.
Sigma 9 27
Large-sized model for heavier pilots. The glider model is EN/LTF C certified.
Sigma 9 29
Extra large-sized model for heavier pilots. The glider model is EN/LTF C certified.

Specifications (Sigma 5 26)

References

External links

Sigma
Paragliders